Henn Treial (born Herbert Treial; 15 October 1905 Aardla – 19 November 1941 Tartu) was an Estonian journalist, editor and politician. He was a member of VI Riigikogu (its Chamber of Deputies).

References

1905 births
1941 deaths
Members of the Estonian National Assembly
Members of the Riigivolikogu
Estonian journalists
Estonian editors
Estonian people executed by Nazi Germany
People from Kastre Parish